Regina Yaou (sometimes N'doufou) (10 July 1955 – 4 November 2017) was a writer from Ivory Coast.

Life and career
Yaou was born in Dabou and raised by her aunt in a literary family, and wrote her first poems between the ages of twelve and fourteen. She attended the technical high school in Cocody, where in 1977 she participated in a literary contest organized by the publishing house Nouvelles éditions africaines; this led to the creation of her first work, a novella entitled La Citadine which has remained unpublished, but which won a prize in the contest. After leaving school she worked for a few years before returning to her studies in 1982; she attended the University of Tours and spent a year at the Université Félix Houphouët-Boigny in Cocody. She has also lived in Akrou, in the Jacqueville Department. She was declared a winner of literary competition organized by the new African edition in 1977 

Yaou completed her first novel, Lezou Marie ou les écueils de la vie, in 1977, presenting it to an editor in 1981 and publishing it in 1982. She followed it with La révolte d'Affiba in 1985; she has since written numerous other novels. From 1991 until 1993 she was in the United States as a guest lecturer at a number of universities. She then returned to Ivory Coast, where in addition to her literary activities she held a number of other positions; in 2005 she returned to the United States once more, for two years of comparative study of the similarities between the stories of the southern United States and those of her home country. In 2009 she returned again to Ivory Coast.

Beginning in the 1990s, Yaou published a number of works under pseudonyms such as Joëlle Anskey and Ruth Owotchi. Her work generally focuses on themes of modern life and the role of women in Ivorian society, and includes discussion of domestic violence, infidelity, and maternity, among other issues. In 2014 she received the excellency award from the president of Cote d' Ivoire, and was the writer in the spotlight at the last international book fair at Abidijan.

She died on 4 November 2017.

Works

As Regina Yaou
1977: La Citadine, unpublished.
1982: Lezou Marie ou les écueils de la vie. Abidjan, Nouvelles Éditions africaines
1985: La Révolte d’Affiba.  Abidjan, Nouvelles Éditions africaines
1988: Aihui Anka.  Abidjan, Nouvelles Éditions africaines (republished 1999)
1997: Le Prix de la Révolte. Abidjan, Nouvelles éditions ivoiriennes
1998: Les Germes de la mort. Tome 1: Brah la villageoise. Abidjan, Nouvelles éditions ivoiriennes
2001: L’indésirable. Abidjan, Centre d'édition et de diffusion africaines (CEDA)
2005: Le glas de l’infortune. Abidjan, Nouvelles éditions ivoiriennes-CEDA
2009: Coup d’État. Abidjan, Nouvelles éditions ivoiriennes
2010: Dans l’antre du loup. Abidjan, Les Classique Ivoiriens
2012: Opération fournaise. Abidjan, Nouvelles éditions ivoiriennes-CEDA

Pseudonymous
1999: Symphonie et Lumière. Adoras, Nouvelles éditions ivoiriennes
1999: Cœurs rebelles. Adoras, Nouvelles éditions ivoiriennes
2000: La fille du lagon. Adoras, Nouvelles éditions ivoiriennes
2001: Les miraculés. Adoras, Nouvelles éditions ivoiriennes
2004: Le Contrat. Clair de Lune, Puci
2004: Tendres ennemis. Clair de Lune, Puci
2004: L’amour en exil. Clair de Lune, Puci
2004: Piège pour un cœur. Clair de Lune, Puci

References

1955 births
2017 deaths
Ivorian women novelists
20th-century novelists
20th-century women writers
21st-century novelists
21st-century women writers
People from Dabou
University of Tours alumni
Université Félix Houphouët-Boigny alumni
People from Lagunes District
Ivorian writers in French